Ericameria arborescens is a North American species of flowering plants in the family Asteraceae known by the common name goldenfleece. It is widespread across much of California and found also in southwestern Oregon.

Ericameria arborescens grows in chaparral communities and open woodlands. This is a resinous, glandular shrub or small occasionally exceeding 5 meters (over 17 feet) in height. It has many erect branches covered in  very thin, needle-like to lance-shaped leaves 3-6 centimeters (1.2-2.4 inches) long. Atop each stem is an inflorescence of many bright golden flowers, each a rounded bunch of disc florets about 5 mm (0.2 inches) wide. This plant is adapted to ecosystems prone to wildfire.

References

External links
Jepson Manual Treatment
United States department of Agriculture Plants Profile
Callphotos Photo gallery, University of California

arborescens
Flora of California
Flora of Oregon
Flora of the Klamath Mountains
Flora of the Sierra Nevada (United States)
Natural history of the California chaparral and woodlands
Natural history of the California Coast Ranges
Natural history of the San Francisco Bay Area
Natural history of the Transverse Ranges
Taxa named by Asa Gray
Taxa named by Edward Lee Greene
Flora without expected TNC conservation status